Vilho Veikko Päiviö Helanen (24 November 1899 – 8 June 1952) was a Finnish civil servant and politician.

Helanen was born in Oulu, and was a student as the University of Helsinki, where he gained an MA in 1923 and completed his doctorate in 1940. From 1924 to 1926 he edited the student paper Ylioppilaslehti and around this time joined the Academic Karelia Society. He served as chairman of the group from 1927 to 1928, from 1934 to 1935 and again from 1935 to 1944, helping to turn the Society against democracy. Helanen visited Estonia in 1933 and was amazed at the high levels of popular support for the far right that he witnessed there, in contrast to Finland where it was a more marginal force. As a result, he was involved in the coup attempt of the Vaps Movement in Estonia in 1935.

Helanen was a major inspiration for the Patriotic People's Movement and a close friend of Elias Simojoki, although he did not join the group and instead became a vocal supporter of Adolf Hitler. He formed his own group, Rising Finland, in 1940 which, despite his earlier radicalism, became associated with the mainstream National Progressive Party. Helanen was one of the leaders of the Pro-German resistance movement in Finland.

Rising to be head of the civil service during the Second World War he was imprisoned after the war for treasonable offences. Following his release he worked for Suomi-Filmi and also wrote a series of detective novels.  He died of a heart attack in the railway station at Frankfurt am Main, West Germany.

References

1899 births
1956 deaths
People from Oulu
People from Oulu Province (Grand Duchy of Finland)
Patriotic People's Movement (Finland) politicians
Finnish civil servants
Writers from Northern Ostrobothnia
Finnish military personnel of World War II
Prisoners and detainees of Finland
20th-century Finnish novelists
Finnish Nazis
Nazi politicians
Finnish expatriates in Estonia